Angadippuram is a major suburb of Perinthalmanna town, in Malappuram District of Kerala. It was the capital of the powerful medieval kingdom of Valluvanad. Angadippuram is also known for Angadippuram Laterite, a notified go-heritage monument. Angadippuram is famous for its two temples, the Thirumandhamkunnu Temple and the Tali Mahadeva Temple. Kozhikode - Palakkad National Highway 966 passes through the town and Angadipuram Railway Station is one of the major railway station on the Nilambur - Shornur Line of Palakkad Division, Southern Railways. It is connected to major cities Kochi and Thiruvananthapuram through this line.

Places of interest
Angadippuram is actually a temple town, as it is rich in the case of number of temples. Nearly 12 temples are there in the village. The Thirumandhankunnu Bhagawathy  Temple was built by the erstwhile kings/rulers of Valluvanad.  The goddess Bhagavathi at the temple is the family god (kuladaivam) of the Valluvokonathiris.  This temple has gained prominence lately.  The village is one of the biggest in the Malappuram district. It is filled with traditions and a flourishing tourism business.
Apart from Thirumandhamkunnu Bhagavathy Temple, there is yet another important pilgrim centre in the village is the Tali temple which is also near the highway. The holy shrine in Puthanangadi is another place of solace to the masses which is 2 kilometers away from the town in Valanchery road.

Angadippuram is now known as the temple town of Malabar. There are so many Hindu temples situated here including Sree Thirumanthamkunnu temple and Thali temple.

Thirurkkad is an automobile area near angadippuram, there are lot of automobile showrooms in Thirurkkad and its near places.

History

Angadipuram was the capital of Valluvanad. Valluvanad was ruled by a Samanthan Nair clan known as Vellodis, similar to the Eradis of neighbouring Eranad and Nedungadis of Nedunganad. The rulers of Valluvanad were known by the title Valluvakonathiri/Vellattiri.

Valluvanad was an erstwhile princely state in the present state of Kerala, that extended from the Bharathapuzha river in the South to the Panthaloor Mala in the North. On the west, it was bounded by the Arabian Sea at Ponnani and on the east by the Attapadi Hills.

Transport

Railway

Angadipuram railway station is a major railway station on the Nilambur–Shoranur line.

Trains are available from here to Nilambur, Shoranur, Palakkad, Kottayam and Kochuveli.

Road

Angadippuram is situated on the Kozhikode–Palakkad National Highway 966.

Valancheri–Nilambur State Highway 73 joins the NH 966 at Angadippuram. Kottakkal–Perinthalmanna road which joins SH 73 at Vylongara in Angadippuram, another important road is State Highway 60 which starts from Angadippuram and ends in Cherukara.

See also
 Nilambur - Shoranur Railway Line
 Angadipuram Laterite
 Perinthalmanna
 Valluvanad

References

External links

Cities and towns in Malappuram district
Perinthalmanna area